Ecnomiomorpha is a genus of moths belonging to the subfamily Tortricinae of the family Tortricidae.

Species
Ecnomiomorpha aurosa Razowski & Becker, 1999
Ecnomiomorpha aurozodion Razowski & Becker, 1999
Ecnomiomorpha belemia Razowski & Becker, 1999
Ecnomiomorpha caracana Razowski & Becker, 1999
Ecnomiomorpha chrestodes Razowski & Becker, 1999
Ecnomiomorpha nigrivelata (Walsingham, 1914)
Ecnomiomorpha novaelimae Razowski & Becker, 1999
Ecnomiomorpha parae Razowski & Becker, 1999
Ecnomiomorpha rondoniae Razowski & Becker, 1999
Ecnomiomorpha tubulifera Razowski & Becker, 1999

See also
List of Tortricidae genera

References

 , 1959, Am. Mus. Novit. 1959: 3.
 , 2005, World Catalogue of Insects 5

External links
tortricidae.com

Euliini
Tortricidae genera